Uranophora broadwayi is a moth in the subfamily Arctiinae. It was described by William Schaus in 1896. It is found in Trinidad.

References

Moths described in 1896
Euchromiina